Hell on Earth is the third studio album by the American hip hop duo Mobb Deep, released on November 19, 1996, through Loud and RCA Records. A sequel to Mobb Deep's previous album, the critically acclaimed The Infamous (1995), Hell on Earth is entirely produced by group member Havoc and features guest appearances from rappers Nas, Raekwon, Method Man, and frequent collaborator Big Noyd. The album includes the acclaimed singles "G.O.D. Pt. III" and "Hell on Earth (Front Lines)," as well as "Drop a Gem on 'Em," a response to 2Pac's diss track "Hit 'Em Up." A promotional single, "Still Shinin'", was released earlier that year and later added to the album. 

The album, one of the earliest enhanced CDs, also contains an additional track ("In the Long Run") that at the time, had to be unlocked with the use of a computer. The album garnered widespread acclaim from critics, and was certified gold by the Recording Industry Association of America on April 9, 1997.

Background
Since most of the album was recorded during the height of the East Coast-West Coast rivalry, many fans considered the darker songs to be subtle disses toward 2Pac and other West Coast emcees, but Prodigy sends shout-outs to a list of West Coast artists such as Snoop Dogg, Tha Dogg Pound, and Xzibit in the liner notes.

Music
Building on the sound of The Infamous, Havoc experimented with an eerie, atmospheric style of production, sampling pianos, string sections, and film scores. Like Mobb Deep's two previous albums, the lyrics explore themes of crime and violence, with more of a focus on retribution and payback.

Reception

Hell on Earth was met with widespread acclaim from music critics. Selwyn Seyfu Hinds of The Source praised Prodigy for "painting an endless series of chilling, near-surreal cinemascapes", also stating that Havoc "comes through with a surprisingly high octane performance". He concluded that Mobb Deep were "the most intense, most authentic, most powerful practitioners" of East Coast hardcore hip hop during the 1990s. Los Angeles Times writer Cheo Hodari Coker called it "just as alluring, pessimistic and downright scary" as The Infamous, adding that "with Scorsese-like finesse, Mobb Deep serves up its underworld with such verve that even the most brutal characters glow with respectful purpose". Sacha Jenkins of Spin believed that the album "pursues retribution like Charles Bronson in the Death Wish flicks", also noting that "very occasionally, you'll hear a longing for sanctuary inside Mobb Deep's insanity". Entertainment Weeklys Matt Diehl described it as a "haunting portrait of New York-style thug life" and a "thumping mix where gunshots clash with eerie strings".

In a retrospective piece, AllMusic critic Steve Huey felt that the album "refines the Mobb Deep formula, amplifying much of what made The Infamous a success. The bleak street narratives are even more violent and extreme, and the production is even grittier and creepier". In The New Rolling Stone Album Guide, Chris Ryan commended Mobb Deep's artistic progression, stating, "If Infamous was a chilling documentary, Hell on Earth is a crime saga of mythical proportions. The stickup kids of the last album become hitmen and corner drug pushers become crime kingpins". The album was included in Qs 50 Heaviest Albums of All Time.

Track listing 
All songs produced by Mobb Deep.

Charts

Weekly charts

Year-end charts

Certifications

See also
List of number-one R&B albums of 1996 (U.S.)

References

External links
http://www.discogs.com/viewimages?release=847467

Mobb Deep albums
1996 albums
Albums produced by Havoc (musician)
Loud Records albums